Liuba County is a county under the administration of Hanzhong City, in the southwest of Shaanxi province, China. It is the northernmost county-level division of Hanzhong.

The Zhang Liang temple is located in Liuba, Zhang Liang supposedly lived in reclusion at the site. There is also a 4000-year old Gingko tree in the county.

Administrative divisions
As 2019, Liuba County is divided to 1 subdistrict and 7 towns.
Subdistricts
 Zibai Subdistrict

Towns

Climate

Transport 

 China National Highway 316
 China National Highway 244
 G85 Yinchuan–Kunming Expressway

References

County-level divisions of Shaanxi
Hanzhong